"I Would Like" is a song by Swedish singer Zara Larsson. It was released on 11 November 2016, by TEN Music Group, Epic Records and Sony Music. First released as a promotional single, it was later announced as an official single and the fourth single from Larsson's second and international debut studio album, So Good.

Background
Larsson performed the song on the thirteenth series of The X Factor on 4 December 2016. On 30 December 2016, the song peaked at number two, making it her highest-charting single in the UK at the time. "Symphony" became her highest-charting single four months later when it peaked at number one in April 2017. The song has a sample of "Dat Sexy Body" from the Jamaican singer Sasha.

Track listing
Digital download
"I Would Like" – 3:44

Digital download
"I Would Like" (R3hab Remix) – 2:27

Digital download
"I Would Like" (Gorgon City Remix) – 4:23

Charts

Weekly charts

Year-end charts

Certifications

Release history

References

2016 singles
2016 songs
Zara Larsson songs
Epic Records singles
Sony Music singles
Songs written by Stefan Johnson
Songs written by Eskeerdo
Songs written by Marcus Lomax
Songs written by Jordan Johnson (songwriter)
Song recordings produced by the Monsters & Strangerz
Songs written by James Abrahart
Songs written by Zara Larsson